The Oberhohenberg (1,011 metres) is the second highest mountain of the Swabian Alb, only four metres lower than the Lemberg. It is one of the "ten thousanders."

The ruins on its top derive from the year 1449, when Oberhohenberg Castle together with the town of Hohenberg, at the foot of the mountain, were destroyed in a local feud.

Mountains and hills of the Swabian Jura
One-thousanders of Germany